Sing Children Sing is an album by English singer-songwriter Lesley Duncan, released in 1971. It was produced by Jimmy Horowitz who was married to Duncan at the time. The musicians included then rising star Elton John on piano, guitar legend Chris Spedding and Pentangle drummer Terry Cox, all of whom were on a break from recording John's Madman Across the Water album, as well as noted percussionist Ray Cooper. Duncan first rose to prominence when John recorded her composition "Love Song" for his Tumbleweed Connection album in 1970.

"Love Song" has been covered by numerous artists, including Elton John (on his album Tumbleweed Connection), Olivia Newton-John, Barry White and Neil Diamond.

Track listing
All songs by Lesley Duncan unless otherwise noted.
"Chain of Love" (Duncan, Jimmy Horowitz) - 4:43 
"Lullaby" - 3:52 
"Help Me Jesus" - 3:13 
"Mr. Rubin" - 7:04 
"Rainbow Games" - 2:42 
"Love Song" - 3:38 
"Sunshine (Send Them Away)" - 3:30 
"Crying in the Sun" (Duncan, Horowitz) - 3:10 
"Emma" (Duncan, Horowitz) - 2:37 
"If You Won't Be Mine" - 2:56 
"Sing Children Sing" - 3:39

Personnel
Lesley Duncan – vocals, guitar, mandolin
Jimmy Horowitz – organ, piano, celeste, keyboards
Tony Campo	 – bass
Terry Cox – drums
Elton John – piano
Tristan Fry – percussion
Joe Moretti – guitar
Chris Spedding – guitar, bouzouki
Ray Cooper – percussion

Production notes
Produced by Jimmy Horowitz
Engineered by Andy Knight and Mike Claydon
Art direction by John Hays
David Katz – string arrangements

Edsel Records UK released the album on CD for the first time on Dec. 12, 2000.

References

1971 debut albums
Lesley Duncan albums
Albums recorded at IBC Studios